Boris Pašanski, often spelled Pashanski in English-language media, is a Serbian tennis coach and former professional tennis player. He reached a career-high ranking of world number 55 on 27 February 2006.

Betting controversy
On October 24, 2007, Pašanski was beaten by Dmitry Tursunov in the 2nd round of the St. Petersburg Open by the score 4–6, 6–3, 6–4. The match was associated with highly irregular betting patterns on the online betting exchange Betfair. Large bets were being made on Tursunov to win at odds 1.2 when Pašanski was leading by a set and a break, extremely low odds in such circumstances. There was suspicion among market observers that Pašanski threw the match, with or without the active collusion of Tursunov. However, Betfair decided not to void bets on the match.

Performance timeline

Singles

ATP career finals

Doubles: 1 (1 runner-up)

ATP Challenger and ITF Futures finals

Singles: 25 (12–13)

Doubles: 6 (3–3)

References

External links
 
 
 
 Pashanski world ranking history

1982 births
Living people
Serbia and Montenegro male tennis players
Serbian expatriate sportspeople in Malta
Serbian male tennis players
Serbian tennis coaches
Tennis players from Belgrade
Yugoslav male tennis players